The World Brewers Cup (WBC or WBrC) is an annual international coffee brewing competition organized by World Coffee Events, an organization founded by the Specialty Coffee Association. The stated goal of the competition is to showcase the craft and skill of filter coffee brewing by hand, promoting manual coffee brewing and quality of service. Contestants qualify for the international competition by winning their respective national championships. As of 2019, there were approximately 40 participating national organizations. The annual location of the event is determined by the World Coffee Events organizing committee, and is typically held in conjunction with the World Barista Championship, the World Coffee Roasting Championship, and the World Latte Art Championship. The first World Brewers Cup was held in 2011 in Maastricht, Netherlands. The 2022 WBrC will be held in Melbourne, VIC, Australia.

Format and rules 
To qualify for the World Brewers Cup, contestants must win their respective national championship organized by affiliated national organizations. The national champion may be substituted by the national organization if they are unable to attend.

The WBrC consists of two rounds: a first round and a finalist round. In the first round, every competitor is required to complete two coffee services: a compulsory service and an open service.

For the compulsory service, competitors prepare three coffee beverages utilizing the same whole bean coffee provided to them by the competition organizers. In the compulsory service, competitors' coffees are evaluated on a standardized numerical scale based on several sensory criteria including aroma, flavor, aftertaste, acidity, body, balance, and overall perception.

For the open service, competitors may utilize any whole bean coffee of their choosing and must also accompany their beverage preparation with a 10-minute presentation. During the open service, the competitor typically explains the origin of the coffee, the brewing method, and tasting notes while brewing at least three beverages, one for each of the three sensory judges.  In the open service, both the taste and presentation are scored by the judges. A total dissolved solids (TDS) measurement is also taken for each beverage for reference purposes and to ensure a maximum TDS of less than or equal to 2% (20,000 ppm).

The six competitors with the highest combined score from the first round will go on to compete in the finals round consisting exclusively of an open service.

One competitor from the final round with the highest score is named the World Brewers Cup Champion.

Brewing equipment and techniques 
Competitors may use any manual (unpowered) brewing device and technique of their choosing. In principle, any manual technique as distinct from "espresso" type extraction is permitted, including methods that use pumping or pressurized extraction so long as it is manually powered. Competitors are mandated to bring their own brewing equipment so long as it meets the criteria of being a manual device. Different devices and methods have been employed by competitors at the WBrC, including French press, pour-over, modified AeroPress and other hybrid techniques. Most competitors employ a pourover technique using commercially available brewers (such as Hario V60 or Kalita Wave) or modified versions. Some competitors have also used custom-designed brewers in competition.

There are no hard limitations on the recipes (coffee to water ratio), which may be varied by the competitor. Any bean (or combination) as well as water source, without additives, can be employed. The limitation on the final brew is only that it must be less than or equal to 2% TDS to distinguish from espresso-type coffee.

Past winners

References

Brewing
Coffee preparation
Events in Melbourne
Food and drink awards